Fritz Schumacher may refer to:

Fritz Schumacher (architect) (1869–1947), German architect and urban designer
E. F. Schumacher (Ernst Friedrich "Fritz" Schumacher, 1911–1977), economist and founder of the charity Intermediate Technology Development Group

See also
 Friedrich Schumacher, World War I German flying ace